A C-trie is a compressed trie data structure. It achieves lower memory and query time requirements at the expense of reduced flexibility.

References 

 Maly, K. Compressed tries. Commun. ACM 19, 7, 409–415. 

Trees (data structures)